Ayushman Bhava is a 1998 Indian Malayalam-language film, directed by  Suresh Vinu and produced by Ambili Pravachambalam. The film stars Jayaram, Divya Unni, Mohini and Innocent. The film has musical score by Johnson and songs by A. T. Ummer.

Plot
Govinda Menon is in deep financial crisis and he is facing attachment of his family property and he decides to end his life as he ran out of options to save his pride. However he ends up saving the life of Suryan(Jayaram) who attempted suicide in front of his eyes. Govinda Menon takes Suryan to his house masquerading him as the son of his friend and a famous writer who wants solitude to write the story for a film.

Suryan comes from an affluent family and was thrown out of his family due to a misunderstanding and he became lonely and desperate and didn't see any reason to live. Govinda Menon enters into an agreement with Suryan to end his life after an year and he takes an LIC policy in Suryan's name with him as Nominee so that he gets the money after Suryan's death.  However, Suryan falls in love with Sumangala (Divya Unni), Menon's daughter and wants to live again.

Govinda Menon is upset with Suryan and wants to break their love. However, things take a turn when Suryan is traced by his family members. Watch the full movie to know how the story unfolds in the end.

Cast
Jayaram as Suryan
Divya Unni as Sumangala
Mohini as Priya
Innocent as Govinda Menon
Srividya as Suriyan's mother
Jagathy Sreekumar as Madhava Menon, brother in law of Govinda Menon and LIC agent. 
Manka Mahesh as Devaki, wife of Govinda Menon
Manju Pillai as dance teacher Gangavathy. 
Sai Kumar as Prakash, lover of Priya
Augustine as Moosakutty
K.T.S. Padannayil as father of Govinda Menon
Pala Narayanan Nair as father of Priya (Mohini)
Chali Pala as Moosakutti's advocate
Sajitha Betti as Priya (Child)

Soundtrack
The music was composed by Johnson and A. T. Ummer.

References

External links
 

1998 films
1990s Malayalam-language films